WKDO can refer to:

 WKDO (AM), a radio station (1560 AM) licensed to Liberty, Kentucky, United States
 WKDO-FM, a radio station (98.7 FM) licensed to Liberty, Kentucky, United States